Ian Lionel Watson (born 7 January 1944) was an English footballer with Queens Park Rangers. Watson played 202 league games for QPR scoring 1 goal.

References

1944 births
Living people
Footballers from Hammersmith
Association football fullbacks
English footballers
Queens Park Rangers F.C. players
Chelsea F.C. players
English Football League players